Pasohlávky is a municipality and village in Brno-Country District in the South Moravian Region of the Czech Republic. It has about 700 inhabitants. It is a summer resort at the Nové Mlýny Reservoir.

Geography
It lies in the Dyje–Svratka Valley. The municipality is situated on the northwestern shore of the Nové Mlýny Reservoir.

History
The first written mention of Pasohlávky is from 1276, under its original name Uherčice na Bílém břehu. Because of the construction of the Nové Mlýny reservoirs, the cadastral area of the neighbouring village of Mušov was joined to Pasohlávky on 1 January 1980 and most of the inhabitants moved to Pasohlávky. The area of Mušov was subsequently flooded.

Sights

The area of Pasohlávky and Mušov are important archaeological sites. There are 28 known archaeological sites in the former Mušov and 21 in Pasohlávky.  Remains of a permanent Roman fortress from the 2nd century have been explored here. There is a museum with an exhibition dedicated to the Roman people and local discoveries.

The Church of Saint Anne was originally a chapel, rebuilt in 1675 and extended to a church in 1811. In 1818, a tower was added.

On the island in the Nové Mlýny Reservoir is the last remnant of Mušov, the Church of Saint Leonard of Noblac. The originally Romanesque church from the late 12th or early 13th century was rebuilt in the Gothic style in the 14th century.

Aqualand Moravia in Pasohlávky is a water park that is the most visited tourist destination in the South Moravian Region.

References

External links

Villages in Brno-Country District